Peek & Poke is the third studio album by British indie pop musical project White Town, released in 2000 through Mishra's label Bzangy Records.

The lead single, "Another Lover", was released as an EP in March 1999. Mishra released the EP via Parasol, the independent record label which had released his material prior to the success of "Your Woman" and its parent album.

Track listing

References

White Town albums
2000 albums
Electronica albums by British artists
Synth-pop albums by British artists